The Fiat A.20 was an Italian aero-engine of the 1920s.  It was a water-cooled V12 engine that was used by early versions of the Fiat CR.20 fighter and the Macchi M.41 seaplane.

In 1923, FIAT built the A.15, a 430 hp (320 kW) water-cooled V12 engine. While no production of the A.15 ensued, it formed the basis for the Fiat A.20, which differed in being a Monobloc engine, and delivered a similar power despite a reduction in capacity from 20.3 to 18.7 L (1,239 to 1,141 in3).

Variants
A.20Normal compression (5.7:1 compression)
A.20 S.High compression version (6:1 compression)
A.20 AQ.(AQ - Alta Quota - high altitude) High altitude version (8:1 compression)

Applications
Ansaldo AC.4
CANT 15
CANT 25
Fiat CR.20
Macchi M.41
Macchi M.71
Piaggio P.6
SIAI S.58bis
SIAI S.67

Specifications (A.20)

See also

References

External links

 "The Fiat A.20". Flight, 6 May 1926. p. 275.
 "The Fiat Engines". Flight, 9 December 1926, p. 807.

A.20
1920s aircraft piston engines